Indian Head is an unincorporated community in Fayette County, Pennsylvania, United States. Indian Head has a post office with ZIP code 15446, which opened on December 17, 1853. The community was named for its location near the headwaters of Indian Creek.

References

Unincorporated communities in Fayette County, Pennsylvania
Unincorporated communities in Pennsylvania